Ghar Dwaar is a 1985 Hindi family drama film starring Tanuja and Sachin Pilgaonkar in the lead roles. The film was remade in Telugu as Aadi Dampatulu, in Kannada as Maneye Manthralaya and in Tamil as Kudumbam Oru Kovil.

Plot
Dhanraj resides with his two brothers, Chander and Ketan, his sister, Asha, and wife, Savitri, in their family home. Dhanraj wants Chander and Ketan to study and get better jobs, so he slogs away at work, and also finds part-time work to keep the in-flow to sustain his family and pay for their education. But this is not enough and a choice must be made to allow only one brother to carry on studying. Ketan feigns an illness and let's Chander continue on to become an engineer, and eventually marries the only daughter, Chanda, of a multi-millionaire widow. Things do not go as planned and Chanda and her mother face humiliation after humiliation at the hands of Dhanraj and his family. Chanda swears to avenge this by destroying the love that binds this family. Watch as Chanda works on each family member individually with the hopes of separating them and dividing their love - so that she can live alone with Chander.

Cast 
 Tanuja as Savitri.
 Sachin Pilgaonkar as Ketan.
 Raj Kiran as Chander.
 Shoma Anand as Chanda.
 Dr. Shriram Lagoo as Dhanraj.
 Ashok Saraf as Bahadur.
 Shraddha Verma as Asha (Munni).
 Jayshree T. as Sheela (Bahadur's Wife)
 Ashalata Wabgaonkar as Ashalata , Chanda's Mother.
 Shivraj as Ketan's boss.

Soundtrack
The music of this movie was composed by Chitragupta. The film featured a popular song named "Mera Babu Chhail Chhabila".

 "Titliyon Se Kahe Do" (Ghar Dwaar / Soundtrack Version) Kishore Kumar
 "Baaja Baja" (Ghar Dwaar / Soundtrack Version) Shabbir Kumar, Alka Yagnik
 "Koi Jaye Kashi" (Ghar Dwaar / Soundtrack Version) Alka Yagnik, Chandrani Mukherjee, Poornima, Suresh Wadkar
 "Meri Behna" (Ghar Dwaar / Soundtrack Version) Mohammad Aziz, Suresh Wadkar, Manhar
 "Boloon Baat Pateki" (Ghar Dwaar / Soundtrack Version) Amit Kumar
 "Saat Pheron Ke" (Ghar Dwaar / Soundtrack Version) Asha Bhosle
 "Hum Na Jaibe" (Ghar Dwaar / Soundtrack Version) Alka Yagnik
 "Swarg Se Sunder" (Slow) (Ghar Dwaar / Soundtrack Version) Chandrani Mukherjee
"Mera Babu Chhail Chhabila" Runa Laila

References

External links
 

1985 films
1980s Hindi-language films
Films scored by Chitragupta
Hindi films remade in other languages
Films directed by Kalpataru